Lesher is a surname. Notable people with the surname include:

Brian Lesher (born 1971), Belgian baseball player
Dean Lesher (1903–1993), American newspaper publisher
Edgar J. Lesher (1914–1998), American aircraft designer 
John Lesher (producer) (born 1966), American film producer
John Vandling Lesher (1866–1932), American politician
Michael Lesher (born 1951), American geologist
Robert O. Lesher (born 1921), American judge